Chukai (Terengganu Malay: Chuka, Jawi: چوكاي), also known by the name of Kemaman Town (Malay: Bandar Kemaman, Terengganu Malay: Bando Mamang, est. pop. (2017): over 170,000) is a mukim and capital of Kemaman District, Terengganu, Malaysia.

The name "Chukai" (proper spelling of the Malay word: cukai) means 'taxes' in Malay. The town is so named due to its position near the estuary of the Kemaman River, whereby taxes and levies were imposed on riverine traffic, especially during the British colonial period. Chukai is the biggest town in southern Terengganu, and its position between the state capitals of Kuantan and Kuala Terengganu as well as proximity to the oil town of Kerteh has turned Chukai into a major commercial hub for the region. Nearby Kemaman Port serves both as a fishing port and supply base for oil platforms off the Terengganu coast.

Attractions 
The Hai Peng Coffee Shop, located just off the main Kuantan-Kuala Terengganu route and near the town centre is famous for its fine coffees.

Other attractions in the vicinity include:
The Ma’ Daerah Turtle Sanctuary Centre (near Kerteh)
Firefly watching along Sungai Kak Yah (Kak Yah River) in Kampung Ibok
The fishing village of Kuala Kemaman
Boating and kayaking along the Chukai River at the Bakau Tinggi Recreational Area

Many beaches are within a short driving distance from Chukai. They remain idyllic, undisturbed by the fast-growing pace of development in Terengganu.

Club Med Cherating Beach is about a 15 minutes drive south away from the town centre, towards Kuantan, Pahang. Another world class resort nearby is the Resorts World Kijal (formerly Awana), about 25 minutes drive north from the town centre, towards Kuala Terengganu, the state capital.

Image gallery

References

External links

 Terengganu Tourism website
 Ma' Daerah Turtle Sanctuary Center

Kemaman District
Mukims of Terengganu